Elliot Provincial Hospital is a provincial-government-funded hospital for the Sakhisizwe Local Municipality area in Elliot, Eastern Cape in South Africa.

Its departments include Emergency, Paediatric, Maternity, Outpatients, Surgical Services, Medical Services, Operating Theatre & CSSD Services, Pharmacy, Anti-Retroviral (ARV) treatment for HIV/AIDS, Post Trauma Counseling Services, X-ray Services, Physiotherapy, NHLS Laboratory, Laundry Services, Kitchen Services and Mortuary.

Hospitals in the Eastern Cape
Chris Hani District Municipality